Sooryante Maranum is a 1980 Indian Malayalam film,  directed and produced by Rajeevnath. The film stars Nedumudi Venu, Ravi Alummoodu, Purushothaman and K. S. Gopinath in the lead roles.

Cast
Nedumudi Venu as Aditya
Ravi Alummoodu
Purushothaman
K. S. Gopinath
Jalaja
Joseph Chacko
Mannar Gopi
Rajan Thazhakkara
Shanthan

References

External links
 

1980 films
1980s Malayalam-language films